Nidal Baba (born August 16, 1972 in Humble, Texas) is a retired U.S. soccer midfielder who was a member of the U.S. U-16 national team at the 1989 FIFA U-16 World Championship.  He also played three games with the MetroStars  during the 1996 Major League Soccer season.

Baba attended Humble High School where he was a two-time Parade Magazine High School All American soccer player.   In 1989, he was a member of the U.S. U-16 national team at the 1989 FIFA U-16 World Championship.  His brother, Imad, scored the winning goal as the U.S. defeated Brazil, the team finished group play with a 1-1-1 record, and failed to qualify for the second round.  He went on to play several games that fall with the U.S. U-20 national team.   He then attended Clemson University, playing on the men's soccer team from 1992 to 1994.  He finished his career with 13 goals and 17 assists.  On February 7, 1996, the MetroStars selected Baba in the 14th round (139th overall) in the 1996 MLS Inaugural Player Draft.  He played only three games before being released.  In 2002, he worked with his brother Imad Baba in a nutrition store in Houston, Texas.

References

1972 births
Living people
People from Humble, Texas
American soccer players
Clemson Tigers men's soccer players
New York Red Bulls players
Major League Soccer players
United States men's youth international soccer players
United States men's under-20 international soccer players
Sportspeople from Harris County, Texas
Soccer players from Texas
Association football midfielders